Cuckold is a 2015 South African drama film directed by Charlie Vundla. It was screened in the Contemporary World Cinema section of the 2015 Toronto International Film Festival. It was also screened at the Pan African Film Festival, in its celebration of Black History Month.

Cast
Terry Pheto as Laura
Louis Roux as Jon
Charlie Vundla as Smanga

References

External links

2015 drama films
2015 films
2010s English-language films
English-language South African films
South African drama films
Zulu-language films